Rear Admiral Ronald Frank Marryott (February 18, 1934 – June 4, 2005) was the Superintendent of the United States Naval Academy from 1986 to 1988. He served as president and CEO of the George C. Marshall Foundation, and president and CEO of the Naval Academy Alumni Association from 1996 to 2000. He also was President of the Naval War College from 1985 to 1986.

Early career
After graduating from the Academy in 1957 Marryott was designated a Naval Aviator. He flew patrol and surveillance operations in P-2V and P-3 aircraft over both the Atlantic and the Pacific and participated in the Cuban Missile Crisis blockade, he also served as Project Mercury recovery officer for the first three manned spaceflights. In the mid-1960s at the academy, he taught naval history and the history of U.S. foreign policy, American government and politics, and international relations. Marryott saw duty in Vietnam and flew numerous Cold War missions. He went on to command Patrol Squadron 9 from 1973 to 1974 and the Naval Air Station, Moffett Field, California. He served as a Navy aviator and commanded the Iceland Defense Force. He also served seven tours in the Pentagon and was President of the Naval War College from 1985 to 1986.

Superintendent
One of his greatest challenges as the academy's superintendent was to stanch the dropout rate for female midshipmen. He appointed a task force to examine the reasons for the high attrition rate in the 1980s, where he found that much of the problem was female recruits often lacked strong backgrounds in sciences or athletics, two staples of life at the academy. Once recruiters started looking for women who were strong in these areas, as were their male counterparts, the attrition rate dropped.

Decorations

  Navy Distinguished Service Medal
  Defense Superior Service Medal
  Legion of Merit with Gold Star
  Meritorious Service Medal
  Air Medal
  Order of the Falcon
  Ordre National du Mérite

Later life
Marryott retired from active duty in 1990 and served as president and chief executive officer of the George C. Marshall Foundation before returning to Annapolis as president and chief executive officer of the academy's alumni association. He retired from the association in 2000, but remained active and served as co-chairman of the Class of '57 fundraising efforts.
He was honored in 2004 as a Naval Academy Distinguished Graduate, he was a member of the class of 1957. He died on June 4, 2005 of complications from leukemia at the age of 71. Marryott was buried with full military honors at the U.S. Naval Academy Cemetery.

References

Ronald F. Marryott's obituary in the Washington Times

External links

1934 births
2005 deaths
People from Eddystone, Pennsylvania
United States Naval Academy alumni
United States Naval Aviators
United States Navy personnel of the Vietnam War
Recipients of the Air Medal
Recipients of the Meritorious Service Medal (United States)
United States Navy admirals
Recipients of the Legion of Merit
Recipients of the Order of the Falcon
Presidents of the Naval War College
Superintendents of the United States Naval Academy
Knights of the Ordre national du Mérite
Recipients of the Defense Superior Service Medal
Recipients of the Navy Distinguished Service Medal
Burials at the United States Naval Academy Cemetery
Military personnel from Pennsylvania
20th-century American academics